Gomishan County is in Golestan province, Iran. The capital of the county is the city of Gomishan. At the 2006 census, the region's population (as Gomishan District of Torkaman County) was 58,725 in 11,828 households. The following census in 2011 counted 63,447 people in 14,645 households, by which time the district had been separated from the county to form Gomishan County. At the 2016 census, the county's population was 68,773 in 18,474 households.

Administrative divisions

The population history and structural changes of Gomishan County's administrative divisions over three consecutive censuses are shown in the following table. The latest census shows two districts, four rural districts, and two cities.

References

 

Counties of Golestan Province